A drum tower or gulou is a tower in the center of an old Chinese city or village, housing signal drums. There was usually also a bell tower nearby.

They were once found all over China in villages, marking the symbolic center of the settlement and used to mark nightfall and to summon the people for civic ceremonies and significant occasions, such as Chinese New Year. 

The drum tower often being located in the symbolic center of a city, downtown districts of several Chinese cities have been named after the tower.

See also
 Drum tower (Chinese Buddhism), a different type of drum tower

Individual drum towers
 Gulou and Zhonglou (Beijing) (Drum Tower and Bell Tower of Beijing)
 Drum Tower of Xi'an
 Drum Tower of Nanjing
 Bianjing Drum Tower

References

Architecture in China

Towers
Traditional East Asian Architecture